Viridian may refer to:

 Viridian, a blue-green pigment
 The Viridian design movement
 Viridian, the codename for Microsoft's Hyper-V hypervisor
 Viridian Group, a Northern Ireland-based energy business
 Viridian (album), by The Greencards (released in 2007)
 "Viridian," a song by Between the Buried and Me on their 2007 album Colors
 Captain Viridian, one of the main characters of the video game VVVVVV
 Viridian Elementary School, an elementary school in Arlington, Texas
 Prince Viridian, a character in the book The Letter for the King, its sequel and TV adaptation.